Papilio anchisiades, the ruby-spotted swallowtail or red-spotted swallowtail, is a butterfly of the family Papilionidae. It is found from southern Texas south to Argentina. Rare strays can be found up to Kansas, southeastern Arizona, and western Texas.

The wingspan is 70–100 mm. There are several generations per year with adults on wing from May to October.

The larvae feed on various species of the family Rutaceae, including Citrus, Casimiroa, and Zanthoxylum species. The adults feed on flower nectar.

Subspecies
Listed alphabetically.
Papilio anchisiades anchisiades – (Venezuela, Colombia to the Guayanas, Peru)
Papilio anchisiades capys (Hübner, [1809]) – (Bolivia to Parana, Argentina, Paraguay)
Papilio anchisiades idaeus (Fabricius, 1793) – ruby-spotted swallowtail (Texas, Mexico to Panama)
Papilio anchisiades lamasi (Brown, 1994) – (Ecuador)
Papilio anchisiades philastrius Fruhstorfer, 1915 – (Trinidad)

Gallery

References

Other reading
Bauer, Erich and Thomas Frankenbach (1998). Schmetterlinge der Erde, Butterflies of the World Part I (1), Papilionidae Papilionidae I: Papilio, Subgenus Achillides, Bhutanitis, Teinopalpus. Edited by Erich Bauer and Thomas Frankenbach.  Keltern: Goecke & Evers; Canterbury: Hillside Books 
Lewis, H. L. (1974). Butterflies of the World  Page 24, figure 9.

External links

anchisiades
Butterflies described in 1788